Güroluk can refer to:

 Güroluk, Başkale
 Güroluk, Bismil